Aleksandr Streltsov (sometimes listed as Olexandr Streltsov; ; born March 7, 1975) is a Ukraine-born Swiss sprinter turned bobsledder. He competed in the bobsled from 2001 to 2005 for Ukraine and for Switzerland since 2005. He won a silver medal in the two-man event at the 2007 FIBT World Championships in St. Moritz.

Streltsov finished 34th in the two-man at the 2002 Winter Olympics in Salt Lake City competing for Ukraine.

References

External links
2002 bobsleigh two-man results
Bobsleigh two-man world championship medalists since 1931
FIBT profile (As Olexandr Sterltsov)

1975 births
Bobsledders at the 2002 Winter Olympics
Living people
Swiss male bobsledders
Ukrainian male bobsledders
Ukrainian male sprinters
Olympic bobsledders of Ukraine